Hotline Miami 2: Wrong Number is a top-down shooter video game co-developed by Dennaton Games and Abstraction Games, and published by Devolver Digital. It takes place before, during and after the events of its predecessor, Hotline Miami, as it focuses on the backstory and aftermath of the previous protagonist, Jacket, slaying parts of the Russian mafia at the behest of anonymous tips left by his answering machine.

The game was first released worldwide for Microsoft Windows, OS X, Linux on 10 March 2015. It then saw its release for PlayStation 3, PlayStation 4 and PlayStation Vita on 10 March 2015 in North America, on 11 March 2015 in Europe, and on 25 June 2015 in Japan. An Android port was released on 4 August 2015. A Nintendo Switch version was released in August 2019 alongside the first game as part of the Hotline Miami Collection. Hotline Miami Collection was also ported to Xbox One on 7 April 2020 and to Stadia on 22 September 2020.

Gameplay 
Gameplay of Wrong Number plays the same to that of its predecessor Hotline Miami. Hotline Miami 2: Wrong Number features a new hard mode, unlocked after completing the Normal story. In Hard mode, enemies are more difficult to take down and some abilities are taken away from the player, such as "enemy-locking".

Thirteen characters are playable as opposed to just Jacket and Biker in the first game; each with their own interpretations as the story unfolds. The masks mechanic is again featured with some masks making a return, while new masks offer new abilities and play styles. Each character has their own special abilities or perks; Corey can do a roll and dive under enemy gunfire, Mark can dual wield two submachine guns and can spread his arms to shoot in opposite directions simultaneously, Tony's fists kill all regular enemies in one blow and knock down heavy enemies for quick ground kills, and Alex and Ash are controlled by the player simultaneously, using a chainsaw and an assortment of guns respectively. A different character or group of characters is available at the start of each level, each chapter telling part of the story from that character's perspective.

A level editor was added after the game's release, which let users create original stories through dialogue crafting. The editor was originally planned for a spring 2015 release, but was postponed, eventually going live on 22 June 2016.

Plot

Characters and setting 
Hotline Miami 2: Wrong Number takes place in an anachronistic order during, before, and after the events of the original, focusing on events in 1985, 1989, and 1991. Following the events of Hotline Miami, the player character, "Jacket", has been arrested after being manipulated into killing off the leadership of the Russian Mob by 50 Blessings, a neo-nationalist terror cell that masquerades as a peaceful activist group, gaining nationwide infamy.

The game follows several playable characters in a series of intersecting plotlines exploring both the background and the aftermath of Jacket's rampage: Martin Brown, a sadistic actor who uses his role in the film Midnight Animal to live out his violent fantasies; The Fans, a group of copycat killers seeking to emulate Jacket; Evan Wright, a journalist who seeks to write a book about the killings; Manny Pardo, a detective who mainly uses violence to dispatch criminals; The Soldier, the basis of the shopkeeper from Jacket's hallucinations in the first game who is part of a commando squad with Jacket in Hawaii; the Son of the Russian Mafia boss of the first game, who seeks to return the Russians to power against the Colombian Cartel; The Henchman, who seeks to retire from the Mafia; Jake, an obese, violent, and nativist member of 50 Blessings, and Richter, a reluctant operative of 50 Blessings who was threatened into committing the murders, both of whom were active alongside Jacket in 1989.

Furthermore, "Richard", a mysterious figure in a rooster mask that occasionally appeared to Jacket in the original game, appears at different points to most of the game's playable characters, taunting and criticizing them for their actions throughout the game.

Story 
In 1991, Jacket is undergoing trial for the series of killings he perpetrated. Meanwhile, journalist Evan Wright is working on a book about the killings and trying to learn more about the people behind it. Evan is given leads by his friend Manny Pardo, a police detective who uses his position to go on killing sprees during stakeout operations, justifying them as self-defense. A slasher film adaptation depicting Jacket as "The Pig Butcher" is also being produced to capitalize on his infamy; the film's star, Martin Brown, dies when he is accidentally shot by his fellow actress with live ammunition on set during the shooting of the film's final scene.

The Fans carry out a string of murders against petty crooks and drug dealers, unaware of the larger context of Jacket's campaign of violence. Eventually they kill a former henchman of the Russian Mafia, and when his boss attempts to reconnect with said henchman the Fans trace his call to his new hideout. The Fans are all killed during this attack; their last survivor, Tony, is personally killed by Pardo after attempting to surrender to the police, to deny him his "fifteen minutes of fame." Following this, Pardo has a nightmare wherein he is outed as the "Miami Mutilator", a serial killer he has seemingly been after to attain fame similar to Jacket, and barricades himself in his home.

In 1985, The Soldier and his squad are conducting special operations against Soviet forces in Hawaii. However, their psychologically troubled Colonel begins to lose his grip on reality as the war proceeds, volunteering them for increasingly desperate and dangerous missions while ruminating on their impending deaths and the loss of the war. Their last assignment involves besieging a heavily guarded Power Plant controlled by the Russians. As they make their way into the building, the commander in charge, having apparently gone insane, murders the plant's technicians and begins a meltdown on the main reactor before shooting himself in the head. The Soldier saves Jacket's life during their escape attempt, after a booby trap explodes and severely injures two members of their unit including Jacket, but dies a year later during a nuclear strike on San Francisco which decisively terminates the war in the Soviets' favor, revealing his appearances to be Jacket's comatose hallucinations.

In 1989, Jake and Richter are sent on individual missions parallel to Jacket's; Jake realizes the officially-peaceful 50 Blessings organization has been the one giving him orders all along when he meets with one of their representatives, who denies everything. Afterwards, he is sent on a suicide mission, which ends differently depending on the player's actions: if the player fails, he is captured, tortured, and eventually killed by the Russian Mafia, and if he succeeds, 50 Blessings takes him to a safehouse and kills him anyway to silence him. Richter is revealed to be reluctant to work with 50 Blessings until they threaten his ailing mother. Richter is eventually captured and imprisoned, but manages to escape during a prison riot orchestrated by 50 Blessings to kill him to keep him from corroborating Jacket's testimony.

Back in 1991, the escaped Richter shares his story with Evan in exchange for plane tickets for his mother to come to Hawaii. Evan's marriage and finances, however, are under pressure as he spends more time working on his book, and he must choose whether he abandons the book or his family.

Meanwhile, the Son is trying to reclaim his father's empire from Colombian gangsters who filled the power vacuum his father's death left. After the Son eliminates the Colombians, he invites his old henchman to visit their new hideout, inadvertently giving away his location to the Fans and triggering the attack depicted earlier. Under the influence of his own designer drugs he goes on a rampage, killing his own men in addition to the superhuman monsters he sees the Fans as, then walking off the hideout's roof on a rainbow bridge to his death.

The epilogue shows Richter, reunited with his mother, hearing on the news that the American and Soviet presidents were both assassinated in an attempted coup d'état, with the prime suspect being an American general. The Soviet Union declares this an act of war, and launches several nuclear attacks against the United States which obliterate Miami and Hawaii. Each of the surviving characters are then shown in their last moments - Manny, drunk and pointing his gun at his barricaded door, Evan either working on his book or eating with his family depending on the player's actions, the actress from Midnight Animal, and finally Jacket alone in a prison cell - before being obliterated by the bombs. Subsequently, starting a new game adds an extra introductory scene where Richard berates the playable characters for, once again, starting down a path that can only end in their deaths.

Development and release 

Hotline Miami 2: Wrong Number was originally made in Game Maker 7, but was ported by Abstraction Games to their own SilverWare engine, using their Game Maker conversion program GameBaker, to make the game able to run on platforms other than Microsoft Windows. The developers have stated that it is the final game of the series. Swedish painter Niklas Åkerblad created the cover art for Hotline Miami 2: Wrong Number. In Japan, Spike Chunsoft released the localized editions of Hotline Miami and Hotline Miami 2: Wrong Number for the PlayStation 4 and PlayStation Vita bundled together and released as Hotline Miami: Collected Edition on 25 June 2015.

Payday 2, a game developed by Overkill Software added Jacket as a playable character as a reward for purchasing the digital special edition of Hotline Miami 2: Wrong Number on Steam and a mask pack for both the standard and digital special editions.

As the game didn't support Windows XP on release, despite other pre-release indications, the community created an unofficial patch which added this compatibility.

The game, along with the original Hotline Miami, was released as part of the Hotline Miami Collection for the Nintendo Switch on 19 August 2019.

Later, Hotline Miami Collection was also ported to Xbox One on 7 April 2020. On 22 September 2020, the Hotline Miami Collection was released on Stadia.

Reception

Critical reception 

Upon release, the game received generally positive reviews from critics. On Metacritic, it holds an aggregated score of 75/100 based on 18 reviews for the PlayStation 4 Version, one of 74/100 based on 67 reviews for the PC version, and one of 66/100 based on four reviews for the PlayStation Vita version. Danny O'Dwyer from GameSpot gave the game a 9/10, praising its techno and intense soundtrack, entertaining, engaging and challenging gameplay, well-designed controls, striking and vibrant visuals, improved enemy placement, lengthy story, as well as the huge variety of characters, levels and locations. He also praised the game for allowing players to use multiple approaches towards a single objective. However, he criticized the lack of weapon customization. He summarized the game by saying that "This is a confident follow-up which improves upon the original in almost every way. This is a tremendously stylish game which entertains throughout, and delights in forcing you out of your comfort zone."

Chris Carter from Destructoid also awarded the game a 9/10, praising the open-ended gameplay, engrossing story, accessible interface and level-creator, as well as the game for allowing players to utilize creativity and strategy in every level. However, he criticized the poor AI. He summarized the game by saying that "Hotline Miami 2 may not be as "profound" as its predecessor, but it's still a bloody good time." Chloi Rad from IGN gave the game an 8.8/10, praising its high replay value, engaging story, sizable maps, rich characters' backstory, character-specific abilities, the improved lock-on system as well as the level-design, which demands players a new and more cautious approach towards dangers. However, she criticized the occasionally frustrating levels. She summarized the review by saying that "Hotline Miami 2: Wrong Number is a great game and a worthy sequel. It's more confident in its style, storytelling ability, and level design than the first game." Alex Carlson from Hardcore Gamer gave the game a 4.5/5, praising its seedy and visceral art design and its improvement on its predecessors gameplay, but criticized its adherence to the established formula. He summed up the review saying "Hotline Miami 2: Wrong Number is purposely discomforting and hypnotically visceral. It's one of the best games released so far this year."

Steven Burns from VideoGamer.com gave the game a 7/10, while praising the narrative as well as the brutal violence featured in the game, which he stated "has tread a fine, sophisticated line between titillation, power, and reflection, an integral part of both narrative and mechanics.", he criticized the oversized maps, as well as the game for being overly difficult, frustrating as enemy attack players where they can't be seen from the camera angle, and restrictive as the game forced players to play a certain way very often. Chris Thursten from PC Gamer gave the game a 57/100, criticizing the meaningless characters, alienating rape scene, rigid playstyle restriction, inconsistent AI, frustrating and unavoidable death as well as technical issues. Yet he still praised the soundtrack, where the "experience is enormously enhanced by their work". He summarized the review by saying that "Restrictive design decisions sap the energy from a series that revels in it, and technical issues deal the killing blow."

Rape depiction controversy 
The demo shown at Rezzed and the 2013 Penny Arcade Expo featured gameplay in the tutorial that had players appear to attempt to assault a woman sexually as the Pig Butcher. The player character lowered his pants and straddled the woman before the scene is interrupted by the director of Midnight Animal, revealing the whole sequence to be a film shoot.

Video game journalists, including Cara Ellison of PC Gamer, spoke out against the usage of sexual assault imagery. In response, Dennis Wedin stated that Dennaton cut the scene from the demo, and that they were reconsidering putting the scene into the final game. Wedin also stated that they cut the scene short to show that that type of violence is not what the Hotline Miami series is about.

On 15 January 2015 it was reported that because of the implied rape scene, the game had been refused classification in Australia, which prohibits sale within the country, effectively preventing its wide release there. In an official statement from Devolver Digital and Dennaton Games the creators mentioned that they have added a cut and uncut option for the slasher-flick level. Dennaton also reconfirmed that the context of the scene is important and that they were "concerned and disappointed" by the actions of the Australian Classification Board, stating it stretched the facts in its judgment of the game. The statement concluded with Dennaton confirming that they will not challenge the ruling. Developer Dennaton Games have since suggested that people in Australia interested in the game should pirate it if they are unable to purchase a retail copy.

Upon the release of the Nintendo Switch Hotline Miami Collection in August 2019, the game became very briefly available to purchase on the eShop in Australia, with the collection containing both Hotline Miami 2 and the original Hotline Miami rated MA15+. According to Devolver, they had applied for an International Age Rating Coalition process for the collection as part of the requirement for publishing on the Switch. Though originally denied a rating, they successfully obtained the appropriate rating on a second submission. However within hours the title was pulled from the eShop, though Australian players who had already purchased the collection are still able to download and play the game. Its erroneous appearance on the Australian eShop was thought to be a mistake by Nintendo or related to a titling error with Devolver's IARC application for the collection.

References

External links 
 

2015 video games
Action video games
Alternate history video games
Cold War video games
Devolver Digital games
Linux games
Nintendo Switch games
PlayStation 3 games
PlayStation 4 games
PlayStation Network games
PlayStation Vita games
Stadia games
Organized crime video games
MacOS games
Top-down video games
Video game prequels
Video game sequels
Video games about police officers
Video games developed in Sweden
Video games featuring female protagonists
Video games set in Hawaii
Video games set in Miami
Video games set in San Francisco
Video games set in 1985
Video games set in 1986
Video games set in 1989
Indie video games
Video games set in 1990
Video games set in 1991
Video games set in prison
Neo-noir video games
Windows games
Works about Colombian drug cartels
Works about the Russian Mafia
Obscenity controversies in video games
Android (operating system) games
Xbox One games
Video games set in Florida